Helicon Focus is a proprietary commercial digital image processing tool, first released in 2003, developed and published by Helicon Soft Limited. Like programs such as CombineZ or Zerene Stacker, Helicon Focus is designed to blend the focused areas of several partially focused digital photographs to increase the depth of field (DOF) in an image.

Overview
Helicon Focus can be used to increase DOF in any situation, though its primary uses are in macro photography, landscape photography and photo-microscopy. In macro photography, the DOF is often very small. To increase it, Helicon Focus is capable of merging several differently focused images together to create one image where the subject is entirely in focus.

Features
 Automatic adjustments during stacking
 "Dust map" for removing black points from the resulting images
 Supports most common file types, including RAW, TIFF, JPEG, JPEG 2000, and BMP
 Can add text and a scale bar
 3D stack visualization and Wavefront .obj export
 (In Pro) Retouch brushes to manually brush in any focused (or unfocused) areas that weren't merged properly
 (In Pro) Create panoramas
 Create image stack animations
 Batch processing

See also
Helicon Filter
Depth of field

External links
Helicon Focus Homepage
Focus stacking Pictures and technic.
Version for Mac OS X
Outback Photo review of Helicon Focus 3.00 and CombineZ5

Digital photography
Photo software
Windows graphics-related software
MacOS graphics-related software